Ibrahim ibn al-Husayn ibn Abi'l-Su'ud al-Hamidi was the second Tayyibi Isma'ili Dāʿī al-Muṭlaq in Yemen from 1151 to his death in 1162.

Life
Ibrahim was a member of the Hamidi branch of the Banu Hamdan. According to the 12th-century Yemeni historian Umara ibn Abi al-Hasan al-Yamani, he was chosen as chief dāʿī by Queen Arwa al-Sulayhi already in 1132, but he was then replaced by the ruler of Aden, Saba ibn Abi'l-Su'ud ibn Zuray, possibly because Ibrahim espoused the Tayyibi sect in the schism with the Hafizis. Tayyibi sources mention none of this, however.

In 1138 he was chosen as chief assistant (maʾdhūn) by the first Tayyibi Dāʿī al-Muṭlaq, Dhu'ayb ibn Musa, and succeeded him upon his death in 1151, becoming thus the head of the Tayyibi community. He resided in Sana'a, under the protection of the city's ruler Hatim ibn Ahmad, who, although espousing the Hafizi sect, did not interfere with the Tayyibi missionary work. He chose Ali ibn al-Husayn ibn al-Walid (died 1159) and then his own son Hatim as maʾdhūn and designated successor. On his death in July 1162, Hatim succeeded him; his descendants monopolized the office of Dāʿī al-Muṭlaq until 1209.

Theological works
As leader of the Tayyibi community, he introduced the Rasāʿil Ikhwān al-Safāʾ into Tayyibi literature, and in his own works incorporated many of the teachings of Hamid al-Din al-Kirmani. The resulting synthesis combined al-Kirmani's cosmology with mythical elements, and formed the foundation of the peculiar Tayyibi system of esoteric exegesis (haqā'iq). His major work was the Kitāb kanz al-walad ("Book of the Child’s Treasure"), which provided the basis for many future Tayyibi haqā'iq authors.

Grave
The burial site of Ibrahim was unknown for a long time. His grave located in Ghayl bani-Hammid, Yemen was successfully identified by Mohammed Burhanuddin on his visit to Yemen in 1961. His mausoleum was built in the year 2007.

References

Sources
 
 

Tayyibi da'is
Yemeni Ismailis
1162 deaths
Year of birth unknown
Banu Hamdan
12th-century Arabs
Ismaili theologians
12th century in Yemen
12th-century Ismailis
12th-century Islamic religious leaders